Delfzijl (abbreviation: Dz) is a railway station in Delfzijl, Netherlands.
It is located on the Groningen–Delfzijl railway after Delfzijl West as the terminus for passengers. The railway line continues further east, but only for freight trains. The station building was completed in 1883 and train services started on 15 June 1884. The trains are currently operated by Arriva.

Location 
The railway station is located at the Johan van den Kornputplein in the city of Delfzijl in the northeast of the province of Groningen in the northeast of the Netherlands. The station is the northeastern terminus for passengers of the Groningen–Delfzijl railway after the railway station Delfzijl West. The railway continues further east, but only for freight trains.

The railway connects via Groningen to the rest of the Dutch railway network.

History 
The station building was completed in 1883.

The Groningen–Delfzijl railway was opened on 15 June 1884. Train services have been provided by Maatschappij tot Exploitatie van Staatsspoorwegen (1884–1937), Nederlandse Spoorwegen (1938–2000), and NoordNed (2000–2005). Since 2005, the trains have been operated by Arriva, a subsidiary of Deutsche Bahn.

Building 
The 19th-century station building is owned by NS Stations. It is of the type Sneek. Five buildings of this type have been built between 1881 and 1883, three of which remain today. The building in Delfzijl was built in 1883.

The building has been a rijksmonument (national heritage site) since 1989.

Services

Trains 

The train services are currently operated by Arriva. The following local service calls at Delfzijl twice per hour:
Stoptrein 37700: Groningen – Groningen Noord – Sauwerd – Bedum – Stedum – Loppersum – Appingedam – Delfzijl West – Delfzijl

Buses 
The bus services are currently operated by Qbuzz. There are seven regional bus connections at the station in Delfzijl with the following destinations:

References

External links 

 Delfzijl station, station information

Transport in Eemsdelta
Buildings and structures completed in 1883
Railway stations in Groningen (province)
Railway stations on the Zuidbroek–Delfzijl railway
Railway stations opened in 1884
Rijksmonuments in Groningen (province)